Events from the year 1993 in Ireland.

Incumbents
 President: Mary Robinson
 Taoiseach: Albert Reynolds (FF)
 Tánaiste:
 John Wilson (FF) (until 12 January 1993)
 Dick Spring (Lab) (from 12 January 1993)
 Minister for Finance: Bertie Ahern (FF)
 Chief Justice: Thomas Finlay
 Dáil: 27th
 Seanad: 20th (from 17 February 1993)

Events
8–17 January – The Braer Storm blew in the North Atlantic.
12 January – Albert Reynolds was elected Taoiseach in Dáil Éireann. A Fianna Fáil–Labour Party coalition government came to power.
10 March – The Gaelic Athletic Association received planning permission for the redevelopment of the Croke Park stadium.
25 March – Castlerock killings: four Catholics were shot dead by the Ulster Defence Association as they arrived for work in Castlerock, County Londonderry, Northern Ireland.
27 May – The first meeting of an Irish head of state with a British monarch took place when President Mary Robinson makes a private visit to Queen Elizabeth II at Buckingham Palace.
1 June – Mother Teresa met President Mary Robinson at Áras an Uachtaráin.
24 June – Dáil Éireann passed the Criminal Law (Sexual Offences) Act, decriminalising consensual homosexual acts.
15 July – The Beef Tribunal ended after 226 days.
September – The sale of land beside a Dublin convent and the consequent exhumation of at least 133 former residents of a Magdalene asylum from unmarked graves brought the existence of these institutions to wide public attention.
16 September – A new green coloured £10 note was issued depicting the writer James Joyce. 
23 October – Shankill Road bombing – Ten people were killed when a Provisional Irish Republican Army (IRA) bomb exploded at a fish shop on the Shankill Road in Belfast.
30 October – Greysteel massacre – The Ulster Defence Association shot 21 people in the Rising Sun Bar in Greysteel, County Londonderry, Northern Ireland, during a Hallowe'en party. They chose the pub as it was in a Catholic area.
12 November – The issue of a new, smaller 10 pence coin meant there was no longer a coin equivalent in size to a florin after 22 years.
December – Brú na Bóinne became the first UNESCO World Heritage Site designated in Ireland.
15 December – Taoiseach Albert Reynolds and British Prime Minister John Major issued a joint Downing Street Declaration on the future of Northern Ireland.
25 December – Elizabeth II spoke of her hopes for peace in Northern Ireland in her Christmas Day speech to the U.K.
29 December – The IRA announced it would fight on against the British presence in Northern Ireland.

Arts and literature
 15 May – Niamh Kavanagh won the Eurovision Song Contest (staged at the Green Glens Arena in Millstreet, County Cork) for Ireland with In Your Eyes, the second of three consecutive Irish wins.
 6 August – The television film The Snapper was released.
 26–7 August – The band U2 played two concerts at the RDS Showgrounds.
 11 November – The final Jacob's Broadcasting Awards ceremony took place in Dublin.
 16 December – The world première of the film In the Name of the Father was held at the Savoy Cinema in Dublin.
 Roddy Doyle was awarded the Booker Prize for his novel Paddy Clarke Ha Ha Ha.
 John Banville's novel Ghosts was published.
 The Irish Film Board was re-established as a funding body under the chairmanship of Lelia Doolan.

Sport

Association football

Domestic football
Shelbourne defeated Dundalk 1–0 at Lansdowne Road to win the FAI Cup.

International football
Alan McLoughlin scored as Ireland drew 1–1 with Northern Ireland to qualify for the 1994 FIFA World Cup in the USA. 
Ireland also went 6th in the world to reach their highest FIFA ranking to date.

Athletics
Runner Marcus O'Sullivan won the world indoor 1,500-metre championship for the third time, in Toronto.

Gaelic football
Derry GAA beat Cork GAA 1–14 to 2–8 to win the All-Ireland Senior Football Championship for the first time.

Golf
The Irish Open was won by Nick Faldo (England).

Hurling
Kilkenny GAA beat Galway GAA 2–17 to 1–15 to win their second consecutive All-Ireland Senior Hurling Championship.

Mountaineering
Pat Falvey and Dawson Stelfox became the first Irish people to reach the summit of Mount Everest.

Births
 21 February – Shane Dowling, hurler (Na Piarsaigh, Limerick).
 20 April – Dan Morrissey, hurler (Ahane, Limerick)
 6 June – Aisling Franciosi, screen actress
 27 June – Rejjie Snow, born Alex Anyaegbunam, hip hop musician
 5 August – Patrick McBrearty, Donegal Gaelic football superstar
 13 September – Niall Horan, member of boy band One Direction

Deaths

5 February – Seán Flanagan, Gaelic footballer, captain of winning Mayo All Ireland football teams in 1950s, Fianna Fáil TD, Cabinet Minister and MEP (born 1922).
11 February – Brian Inglis, journalist, historian and television presenter (born 1916).
15 February – Peter Kavanagh, soccer player (born 1910).
23 March – Denis Parsons Burkitt, surgeon (born 1911).
April – Denis Hegarty, public servant.
5 May – Dermot Boyle, Marshal of the Royal Air Force (born 1904).
29 June – Patrick Lindsay, Fine Gael TD and lawyer (born 1914).
28 July – Stanley Woods, motor cycle racer, with 29 Grand Prix wins and 10 Isle of Man TT wins (born 1903).
14 September – Sheelagh Murnaghan, only Ulster Liberal Party Member of Parliament at Stormont (born 1924).
7 October – Cyril Cusack, actor (born 1910).
1 November – Maeve Brennan, short story writer and journalist (born 1917).
15 November – Jimmy McAlinden, soccer player and manager (born 1917).
28 November – Joe Kelly, motor racing driver (born 1913).
29 December – Marie Kean, actress (born 1918).

See also
1993 in Irish television

References

 
Years of the 20th century in Ireland
Ireland
1990s in Ireland